The Mongol invasions and conquests took place during the 13th and 14th centuries, creating history's largest contiguous empire, the Mongol Empire (1206-1368), which by 1300 covered large parts of Eurasia. Historians regard the Mongol devastation as one of the deadliest episodes in history. In addition, Mongol expeditions may have spread the bubonic plague across much of Eurasia, helping to spark the Black Death of the 14th century.

The Mongol Empire developed in the course of the 13th century through a series of victorious campaigns throughout Eurasia. At its height, it stretched from the Pacific to Central Europe. In contrast with later "empires of the sea" such as the European colonial powers, the Mongol Empire was a land power, fueled by the grass-foraging Mongol cavalry and cattle. Thus most Mongol conquest and plundering took place during the warmer seasons, when there was sufficient grazing for their herds. The rise of the Mongols was preceded by 15 years of wet and warm weather conditions from 1211 to 1225 that allowed favourable conditions for the breeding of horses, which greatly assisted their expansion.

As the Mongol Empire began to fragment from 1260, conflict between the Mongols and Eastern European polities continued for centuries. Mongols continued to rule China into the 14th century under the Yuan dynasty, while Mongol rule in Persia persisted into the 15th century under the Timurid Empire. In India, the later Mughal Empire survived into the 19th century.

Central Asia

Genghis Khan forged the initial Mongol Empire in Central Asia, starting with the unification of the nomadic tribes Merkits, Tatars, Keraites, Turks, Naimans and Mongols. The Uighur Buddhist Qocho Kingdom surrendered and joined the empire. He then continued expansion via conquest of the Qara Khitai and the Khwarazmian dynasty.

Large areas of Islamic Central Asia and northeastern Persia were seriously depopulated, as every city or town that resisted the Mongols was destroyed. Each soldier was given a quota of enemies to execute according to circumstances. For example, after the conquest of Urgench, each Mongol warrior – in an army of perhaps two tumens (20,000 troops) – was required to execute 24 people, or nearly half a million people per said army.

Against the Alans and the Cumans (Kipchaks), the Mongols used divide-and-conquer tactics by first warning the Cumans to end their support of the Alans, whom they then defeated, before rounding on the Cumans. Alans were recruited into the Mongol forces with one unit called "Right Alan Guard" which was combined with "recently surrendered" soldiers. Mongols and Chinese soldiers stationed in the area of the former Kingdom of Qocho and in Besh Balikh established a Chinese military colony led by Chinese general Qi Kongzhi (Ch'i Kung-chih).

During the Mongol attack on the Mamluks in the Middle East, most of the Mamluk military was composed of Kipchaks, and the Golden Horde's supply of Kipchak fighters replenished the Mamluk armies and helped them fight off the Mongols.

Hungary became a refuge for fleeing Cumans.

The decentralized, stateless Kipchaks only converted to Islam after the Mongol conquest, unlike the centralized Karakhanid entity comprising the Yaghma, Qarluqs, and Oghuz who converted earlier to world religions.

The Mongol conquest of the Kipchaks led to a merged society with a Mongol ruling class over a Kipchak-speaking populace which came to be known as Tatar, and which eventually absorbed Armenians, Italians, Greeks, and Goths on the Crimean peninsula to form the modern day Crimean Tatar people.

West Asia

The Mongols conquered, by battle or voluntary surrender, the areas of present-day Iran, Iraq, the Caucasus, and parts of Syria and Turkey, with further Mongol raids reaching southwards into Palestine as far as Gaza in 1260 and 1300. The major battles were the siege of Baghdad, when the Mongols sacked the city which had been the center of Islamic power for 500 years, and the Battle of Ain Jalut in 1260 in south-eastern Galilee, when the Muslim Bahri Mamluks were able to defeat the Mongols  and decisively hault their advance for the first time. One thousand northern Chinese engineer squads accompanied the Mongol Hulagu Khan during his conquest of the Middle East.

East Asia

Genghis Khan and his descendants launched progressive invasions of China, subjugating the Western Xia in 1209 before destroying them in 1227, defeating the Jin dynasty in 1234 and defeating the Song dynasty in 1279. They made the Kingdom of Dali into a vassal state in 1253 after the Dali King Duan Xingzhi defected to the Mongols and helped them conquer the rest of Yunnan, forced Korea to capitulate through nine invasions, but failed in their attempts to invade Japan, their fleets scattered by kamikaze storms.
The Mongols' greatest triumph was when Kublai Khan established the Yuan dynasty in China in 1271. The dynasty created a "Han Army" (漢軍) out of defected Jin troops and an army of defected Song troops called the "Newly Submitted Army" (新附軍).

The Mongol force which invaded southern China was far greater than the force they sent to invade the Middle East in 1256.

The Yuan dynasty established the top-level government agency Bureau of Buddhist and Tibetan Affairs to govern Tibet, which was conquered by the Mongols and put under Yuan rule. The Mongols also invaded Sakhalin Island between 1264 and 1308. Likewise, Korea (Goryeo) became a semi-autonomous vassal state of the Yuan dynasty for about 80 years.

North Asia

By 1206, Genghis Khan had conquered all Mongol and Turkic tribes in Mongolia and southern Siberia. In 1207 his eldest son Jochi subjugated the Siberian forest people, the Uriankhai, the Oirats, Barga, Khakas, Buryats, Tuvans, Khori-Tumed, and Yenisei Kyrgyz. He then organized the Siberians into three tumens. Genghis Khan gave the Telengit and Tolos along the Irtysh River to an old companion, Qorchi. While the Barga, Tumed, Buriats, Khori, Keshmiti, and Bashkirs were organized in separate thousands, the Telengit, Tolos, Oirats and Yenisei Kirghiz were numbered into the regular tumens Genghis created a settlement of Chinese craftsmen and farmers at Kem-kemchik after the first phase of the Mongol conquest of the Jin dynasty. The Great Khans favored gyrfalcons, furs, women, and Kyrgyz horses for tribute.

Western Siberia came under the Golden Horde. The descendants of Orda Khan, the eldest son of Jochi, directly ruled the area. In the swamps of western Siberia, dog sled Yam stations were set up to facilitate collection of tribute.

In 1270, Kublai Khan sent a Chinese official, with a new batch of settlers, to serve as judge of the Kyrgyz and Tuvan basin areas (益蘭州 and 謙州). Ogedei's grandson Kaidu occupied portions of Central Siberia from 1275 on. The Yuan dynasty army under Kublai's Kipchak general Tutugh reoccupied the Kyrgyz lands in 1293. From then on the Yuan dynasty controlled large portions of Central and Eastern Siberia.

Eastern and Central Europe

The Mongols invaded and destroyed Volga Bulgaria and Kievan Rus', before invading Poland, Hungary, Bulgaria, and other territories. Over the course of three years (1237–1240), the Mongols razed all the major cities of Russia with the exceptions of Novgorod and Pskov.

Giovanni da Pian del Carpine, the Pope's envoy to the Mongol Great Khan, traveled through Kiev in February 1246 and wrote:

The Mongol invasions displaced populations on a scale never seen before in central Asia or eastern Europe. Word of the Mongol hordes' approach spread terror and panic. The violent character of the invasions acted as a catalyst for further violence between Europe's elites and sparked additional conflicts. The increase in violence in the affected eastern European regions correlates with a decrease in the elite's numerical skills, and has been postulated as a root of the Great Divergence.

South Asia

From 1221 to 1327, the Mongol Empire launched several invasions into the Indian subcontinent. The Mongols occupied parts of Punjab region for decades. However, they failed to penetrate past the outskirts of Delhi and were repelled from the interior of India. Centuries later, the Mughals, whose founder Babur had Mongol roots, established their own empire in India.

Southeast Asia

Kublai Khan's Yuan dynasty invaded Burma between 1277 and 1287, resulting in the capitulation and disintegration of the Pagan Kingdom. However, the invasion of 1301 was repulsed by the Burmese Myinsaing Kingdom. The Mongol invasions of Vietnam (Đại Việt) and Java resulted in defeat for the Mongols, although much of Southeast Asia agreed to pay tribute to avoid further bloodshed.

The Mongol invasions played an indirect role in the establishment of major Tai states in the region by recently migrated Tais, who originally came from Southern China, in the early centuries of the second millennium. Major Tai states such as Lan Na, Sukhothai, and Lan Xang appeared around this time.

Death toll

Due to the lack of contemporary records, estimates of the violence associated with the Mongol conquests vary considerably. Not including the mortality from the Plague in Europe, West Asia, or China it is possible that between 20 and 57 million people were killed between 1206 and 1405 during the various campaigns of Genghis Khan, Kublai Khan, and Timur. The havoc included battles, sieges, early biological warfare, and massacres.

Timelines

Asia 
 1207–1210 invasion of Western Xia
 1207 conquest of Siberia
 1211–1234 conquest of Jin dynasty
 1216–1220 conquest of Central Asia and Eastern Persia
 1216–1218 conquest of the Qara Khitai
 1219–1220 conquest of Khwarazm
 1256 capture of Alamut
 1220–1223, 1235–1330 invasions of Georgia and the Caucasus
 1222–1327 Mongol invasions of India
 1225–1227 conquest of Western Xia
 1231–1259 invasion of Korea
 1233 conquest of Eastern Xia
 1235–1279 conquest of Song dynasty
 1240–1241 invasion of Tibet
 1241–1244 invasion of Anatolia
 1244–1265 invasion of Dali Kingdom
 1251–1259 invasion of Persia, Syria and Mesopotamia
 1253–1256 invasion of Yunnan
 1253–1256 Mongol campaign against the Nizaris
 1257, 1284, 1287 invasions of Vietnam
 1258 invasion of Baghdad
 1260 Battle of Ain Jalut
 1260 Mongol raid against Syria
 1271 raid against Syria
 1274, 1281 invasions of Japan
 1264–1308 invasion of Sakhalin Island
 1277 battle of Abulustayn
 1277 invasion of Myanmar
 1281 invasion of Syria
 1283 invasion of Khmer Empire
 1287 invasion of Myanmar
 1293 invasion of Java
 1299 invasion of Syria
 1300 Mongol invasion of Myanmar
 1300 Mongol invasion of Syria
 1303 Invasion of Syria
 1307 Mongol invasion of Gilan
 1312 Mongol invasion of Syria

Europe

See also 
 Destruction under the Mongol Empire
 Division of the Mongol Empire
 List of wars and anthropogenic disasters by death toll
 Lists of battles of the Mongol invasion of Europe
 List of battles of the Mongol invasion of Kievan Rus'
 Mongol invasion of Europe
 Mongol military tactics and organization
 Political divisions and vassals of the Mongol Empire

References

Notes

References

Further reading 
 Boyle, J.A.  The Mongol World Enterprise, 1206–1370 (London 1977)
Hildinger, Erik.  Warriors of the Steppe: A Military History of Central Asia, 500 B.C. to A.D. 1700 
 May, Timothy. The Mongol Conquests in World History (London: Reaktion Books, 2011) online review; excerpt and text search
 Morgan, David. The Mongols (2nd ed. 2007)
 Rossabi, Morris. The Mongols: A Very Short Introduction (Oxford University Press, 2012)
 Saunders, J. J. The History of the Mongol Conquests (2001) excerpt and text search
 Turnbull, Stephen. Genghis Khan and the Mongol Conquests 1190–1400 (2003) excerpt and text search
 Bayarsaikhan Dashdondog. The Mongols and the Armenians (1220–1335). BRILL (2010)

Primary sources
 Rossabi, Morris. The Mongols and Global History: A Norton Documents Reader (2011)

External links 

 Worldwide death toll
 The Destruction of Kiev
 Battuta's Travels: Part ThreePersia and Iraq
 Central Asian world cities?
 The Tran Dynasty and the Defeat of the Mongols

13th-century conflicts
14th-century conflicts
Expeditionary warfare
Invasions by the Mongol Empire